Charles John Irving, (7 February 1831 – 23 February 1917) was a British civil servant in the Malay Peninsula.

Career
He was with the Colonial and Immigration Office from 1852 to 1853 and a clerk in the Audit Office at Mauritius from 1853 to 1864. He was one of the very few Straits officials who had studied the Malay political and social systems. He was an expert on native affairs on the Malay Peninsula whom Governors Ord and Anson used in different negotiations. In 1871 Anson sent James W. W. Birch, then Colonial Secretary, together with Auditor-General Irving to see Sultan Abdul Samad at Langat to re-establish order there.

He was acting Lieutenant-Governor of Penang from 1879 to 1880, Resident Councillor of Penang from 1885 to 1887, Colonial Auditor General to the government of the Straits Settlements at Penang from 1867 to 1879 and acting Colonial Secretary of Straits Settlements from 1875 to 1876 under governors Sir Harry Ord, Edward Anson and Sir William Jervois.

He was a member of the newly formed Straits Branch of the Royal Asiatic Society in Singapore, acting as the society's president around 1883.

Honours
He was appointed Companion of the Order of St Michael and St George (CMG) in 1881.

References

Further reading
The Voyages of Mohamed Ibrahim Munshi By Munshi Mohamed Ibrahim, A. Sweeney, N. Phillips Translated by A. Sweeney, N. Phillips Contributor A. Sweeney, N. Phillips Published by Oxford University Press, 1975
The Gentleman's Magazine Published by Printed by F. Jefferies, 1868; p. 237
An Almanack...: By Joseph Whitaker, F.S.A., Containing an Account of the Astronomical and Other Phenomena ...information Respecting the Government, Finances, Population, Commerce, and General Statistics of the Various Nation's of the World, with an Index Containing Nearly 20,000 References By Joseph Whitaker Published by Whitaker's Almanack., 1888; Item notes: 1888; p. 429
The Making of Modern South-east Asia By D. J. M. Tate Published by Oxford University Press, 1979; Item notes: v.1

1831 births
1917 deaths
History of Penang
Administrators in British Malaya
Governors of Penang
Administrators in British Penang
Companions of the Order of St Michael and St George
Chief Secretaries of Singapore
Administrators in British Singapore